is a Japanese manga artist that is best known for his Gundam manga. Most of his works deal with the alternate universe Gundam series such as Mobile Fighter G Gundam, and Mobile Suit Gundam Wing.

Before he became a manga artist, he did package layout for Bandai plamo and package illustration for Namco Famicom games.

Not much is known about him, but in his various works he is depicted as a somewhat overweight man that wears a headband with various pens stuck to it.

Works

Serialized in Comic Bom Bom
The Great Battle III
Gaia Saver
Mobile Fighter G Gundam
Ganbare! Domon-kun Gundam Party
Mobile Suit Gundam W
New Mobile Report Gundam W: Battlefield of Pacifist
New Mobile Report Gundam W: Endless Waltz
New Mobile Report Gundam W: G-UNIT
Mobile Suit Gundam X
Mobile Suit Gundam: Char's Counterattack
∀Gundam
SD Gundam Eiyuden
 SD Gundam Sangokuden Fuuun Gouketsu Hen

Serialized in Gundam Ace
Mobile Suit Gundam SEED Astray
Mobile Suit Gundam SEED X Astray
Mobile Suit Gundam SEED Destiny Astray
Mobile Suit Gundam SEED C.E. 73 Δ Astray
Mobile Suit Gundam 00F
Mobile Suit Gundam 00I
Mobile Suit Gundam 00I 2314

Serialized in Dengeki Hobby Magazine
Mobile Suit Gundam SEED Frame Astrays

Others
BB Senshi Sangokuden Fuuun Gouketsu Hen (poster art)
Marvel Land (character design)

External links
Kōichi Tokita's Catalog

 
1961 births
Living people
People from Chiba (city)